Mico Aytona  is a Filipino actor, singer and dancer.

Personal life 
Aytona is the eldest son of Felix and Leslie Aytona. He has two younger siblings Marco and Fiona.

Filmography

Television

Film

Awards and nominations

Notes

References

1988 births
Living people
Filipino television personalities
Filipino male television actors
Filipino television variety show hosts

ABS-CBN personalities
GMA Network personalities